This is the discography for Swedish progressive metal band Evergrey.

Studio albums

Studio album details

Monday Morning Apocalypse

Track listing

Personnel
Tom S. Englund – vocals, guitar
Henrik Danhage – guitar
Michael Håkansson – bass
Rikard Zander – keyboards
Jonas Ekdahl – drums
Carina Englund – female vocals
Sigvard Järrebring – string arrangement on "In Remembrance"

Torn

Track listing

Personnel

Evergrey
Tom S. Englund – vocals, guitar
Henrik Danhage – guitar
Jari Kainulainen – bass
Rikard Zander – keyboards
Jonas Ekdahl – drums

Additional musicians
Carina Englund – female vocals on "Broken Wings" and "These Scars"

Charts

Glorious Collision

Track listing

Personnel
Tom Englund – vocals, guitar
Rikard Zander – keyboards
Marcus Jidell – guitar
Johan Niemann – bass
Hannes Van Dahl – drums
Carina Englund – female vocals
Salina Englund (Tom Englund's daughter) – guest vocals on "I'm Drowning Alone"

Hymns for the Broken

Track listing

Chart positions

The Storm Within

Track listing

Charts

The Atlantic

Track listing

Escape of the Phoenix

Track listing

Charts

A Heartless Portrait (The Orphean Testament)

Track listing

Personnel
Tom S. Englund – vocals, guitar
Jonas Ekdahl – drums
Rikard Zander – keyboards
Johan Niemann – bass
Henrik Danhage – guitar

Compilation albums

Live albums

Video albums

Singles

Music videos

References 

Heavy metal group discographies
Discographies of Swedish artists